Bruno Vattovaz (20 February 1912 in Koper, Austria-Hungary – 5 October 1943) was an Italian rower who competed in the 1932 Summer Olympics.

In 1932 he won the silver medal as member of the Italian boat in the coxed fours competition.

External links
 profile

1912 births
1943 deaths
Sportspeople from Koper
Italian male rowers
Olympic rowers of Italy
Rowers at the 1932 Summer Olympics
Olympic silver medalists for Italy
Olympic medalists in rowing
Medalists at the 1932 Summer Olympics